Atriplex elegans is a species of saltbush known by the common name wheelscale saltbush, Mecca  orach, or wheelscale. It is native to the Southwestern United States,  and northern Mexico, where it grows in areas of saline or alkaline soils, such as alkali flats and desert dry lakebeds.

Description
This is an annual herb with a scaly branching stem which spreads somewhat upright to heights between 10 and 50 centimeters. The crusty whitish leaves are narrowly oval in shape, sometimes toothed along the edges, and less than 3 centimeters long. The inflorescences bear separate male and female flowers which are in small, hard clusters.

References

External links
Jepson Manual Treatment
USDA Plants Profile
Flora of North America
Photo gallery: var. fasciculata

elegans
Halophytes
Flora of Northwestern Mexico
Flora of the Southwestern United States
Flora of the California desert regions
Flora of the Great Basin
Flora of the Sonoran Deserts
Natural history of the Colorado Desert
Natural history of the Mojave Desert
Plants described in 1849
Flora without expected TNC conservation status